USS Everett F. Larson (DE-554) was a proposed World War II United States Navy John C. Butler-class destroyer escort that was never completed.

The name Everett F. Larson was assigned to DE-554 on 30 November 1943. Plans called for her to be built at the Boston Navy Yard at Boston, Massachusetts. Her construction contract was cancelled on 10 June 1944.

The name Everett F. Larson was reassigned to the destroyer USS Everett F. Larson (DD-830).

References

Navsource Naval History: Photographic History of the U.S. Navy: Destroyer Escorts, Frigates, Littoral Warfare Vessels

John C. Butler-class destroyer escorts
Cancelled ships of the United States Navy